Karl Daniel Meister (May 15, 1891 – August 15, 1967) was a Major League Baseball center fielder. Meister played in four games for the Cincinnati Reds in 1913.

External links

1891 births
1967 deaths
Sportspeople from Marietta, Ohio
Major League Baseball center fielders
Baseball players from Ohio
Cincinnati Reds players
Newark Newks players
Hamilton Maroons players
Dayton Veterans players
Wheeling Stogies players